Lonate may refer to the following places in Province of Varese, Italy:

Lonate Ceppino
Lonate Pozzolo